The Twin Mountains Formation, also known as the Twin Mak Formation, is a sedimentary rock formation, within the Trinity Group, found in Texas of the United States of America.  It is a terrestrial formation of Aptian age (Lower Cretaceous), and is notable for its dinosaur fossils. Dinosaurs from this formation include the large theropod Acrocanthosaurus, the sauropod Sauroposeidon, as well as the ornithopods Tenontosaurus and Convolosaurus.
 It is the lowermost unit of the lower Cretaceous, lying unconformably on Carboniferous strata. It is overlain by the Glen Rose Formation. It is the lateral equivalent of the lower part of the Antlers Formation.

Paleobiota
 Acrocanthosaurus atokensis
 Dromaeosauridae indet.
 Theropoda indet.
 Sauropoda indet.
 Sauroposeidon proteles
 Convolosaurus marri
 Tenontosaurus dossi - "Skull and postcranial skeleton, several individuals."
 Iguanodontia indet.
 Tarsomordeo winkleri

References

Geologic formations of Texas
Aptian Stage
Cretaceous geology of Texas
Early Cretaceous North America
Paleontology in Texas